Rwanda requires its residents to register their motor vehicles and display vehicle registration plates. Current plates are European standard 520 mm × 110 mm, and use Belgian stamping dies.

References

Rwanda
Transport in Rwanda
Rwanda transport-related lists